Belizaire the Cajun is a 1986 film directed by Glen Pitre and starring Armand Assante. It was screened in the Un Certain Regard section at the 1986 Cannes Film Festival.

It chronicles the story of Belizaire Breaux, a village healer (traiteur) in Acadiana in 1859, who becomes entangled in a violent conflict between Cajuns and the new Anglophone arrivals to Southwest Louisiana.

Cast
 Armand Assante as Belizaire Breaux
 Gail Youngs as Alida Thibodaux
 Michael Schoeffling as Hypolite Leger
 Stephen McHattie as James Willoughby
 Will Patton as Matthew Perry
 Nancy Barrett as Rebecca
 Loulan Pitre, Sr. as Sheriff 
 Andre Delaunay as Dolsin
 Jim Levert as Amadee Meaux
 Ernie Vincent as Old Perry
 Paul Landry as Sosthene
 Allan Durand as Priest
 Robert Duvall as The Preacher
 Bob Edmundson as Head Vigilante
 Charlie Goulas as Vigilante

References

External links
 
 

1986 films
1986 drama films
Fictional Cajuns
Films directed by Glen Pitre
Films set in Louisiana
Films set in 1859
American vigilante films
American drama films
1986 directorial debut films
1980s English-language films
1980s American films